Sameh Akram Habeeb is a British-Palestinian journalist. He is the founder and director of think tank organisation "International Centre For Relations & Diplomacy.

Career
In 2007, Habeeb started to intensify his media work as the siege became tougher in Gaza. He launched a blog, Gaza Today, the Untold Story, late in 2007. Between 2007 and 2008 he published tens of articles, photo stories, and features, and blogged on a daily basis. The same year, he started to take photos in Gaza that only focused on humanitarian conditions. His photos were shown on Sky News and published internationally. In April 2008, Habeeb conducted a speaking tour across Italy, lecturing at 25 meetings in universities, colleges and city councils, to speak about the conditions in Gaza.

During the 2008–09 Gaza War he was a source of news in Gaza. He reported for a number of media outlets, including The Real News and was a contributing reporter for BBC, Sky News, Channel 4, ABC, CBC, CNN, and tens of other media outlets on an hourly basis. Working under terrible conditions during the war, he worked as a field reporter with Netwerk TV of the Netherlands, as well as Vandakh, where he did various reports about the war.

During the 23 days of the War on Gaza, Habeeb sent daily dispatches via his blog about the war for all media outlets. His reporting put him in focus, which, he reports, led to numerous threats on his life. PBS studied Habeeb’s work, and drew a comparison between the Israeli and Palestinian media.

In March 2009, Habeeb founded The Palestine Telegraph online newspaper. In April 2010, Habeeb's website featured an interview with the ex-Ku Klux Klan leader David Duke in which Duke stated Israel was a terrorism threat against America. A backer of the website, Jenny Tonge resigned as a patron over the website's posting of the video. In early May 2010, an issue of the Leeds Student newspaper which is based at the Leeds University was removed from sale by the Students' Union after complaints for featuring an interview with Habeeb. He was asked whether the "mainstream media organizations have a hidden agenda?" to which he replied: "They are certainly pro-Israeli. I think you have to ask yourself who controls the media".

Habeeb holds a master's degree in Business Management, and he is a regular guest as a political analyst on Middle East issues on Press TV, BBC and others. In 2009 and 2010, he carried out more than 100 workshops, meetings and conferences across the UK, the Netherlands, Ireland, Scotland, France and Australia, where he conducted lectures on the media in Palestine and the recent political conditions in Gaza and the West Bank. He has also worked with many European and British Members of Parliament in regard to the Israeli–Palestinian conflict, and has spoken repeatedly at the British Parliament.

Initially a Labour Party candidate in the 2018 British local elections in Northwood, London on 3 May, he was suspended from party membership on 3 April prior to an investigation for alleged antisemitic comments.

References



Palestinian journalists
Living people
Year of birth missing (living people)